The European Drivers' Championship was an annual competition in auto racing that existed prior to the establishment of the Formula One world championship in 1950. It was established in 1931 and ran until the end of 1939 with a hiatus from 1933–34, and awarded points to drivers based on the results of selected Grand Prix races, the so-called Grandes Épreuves (this term had been used for the most prestigious races since the 1920s; the only Grande Épreuve to be excluded from the championship was the 1931 German Grand Prix). The championship was discontinued because of the outbreak of World War II in 1939, and no champion was officially declared for the last season.

The championship was run by the Association Internationale des Automobile Clubs Reconnus (AIACR), the forerunner to the FIA who are today's world governing body of motorsport.

History

The 1931 and 1932 seasons were run to existing Formula Libre regulations, with a minimum car weight of 900 kg. The calendar consisted of the Italian Grand Prix, the French Grand Prix and the Belgian Grand Prix/German Grand Prix.

In 1934, the AIACR introduced a maximum weight limit of 750 kg for Grand Prix cars. Already in 1933, new chancellor Adolf Hitler had announced that he would provide 450,000 reichsmarks to German companies to build Grand Prix cars. Eventually, the money was split between bidders, Mercedes-Benz and the newly formed Auto Union. Auto Union took over the P-Wagen concept of Ferdinand Porsche and put the engine behind the driver. Both German manufacturers proved dominant in nearly all races they entered. These cars proved to be the bases for the two companies entries in the first year of the European Championship. Other entries came from manufacturers including Alfa Romeo, whose team were being run by Scuderia Ferrari, Maserati, and Bugatti.

The 750 kg formula lasted until the end of 1937. By then, the German cars had over 600 hp, more than twice the rule makers had expected to be possible with that weight limit. For 1938, a new formula was introduced, limiting also engine sizes. Cars with a supercharger were permitted to have an engine size between 666 cc and 3000 cc, whereas normally aspirated cars were allowed between 1000 cc and 4500 cc. The cars had to weigh between 400 kg and 850 kg; the exact minimum weight specified in the regulations was dependent on a car's engine capacity and followed a linear scale.

At the AIACR's end of season meeting towards the end of 1938, it was expressed that some were not content using the then current points system. Belgium's representative, Mr. Langlois, was asked to come up with an alternative system for 1939. Langlois took several months to propose a new system and there is no evidence to suggest that the previous scoring system was rescinded.

In 1939, war broke out and the AIACR could not meet to publish an official set of championship results. Hermann Lang was declared European champion by Korpsführer Adolf Hühnlein of the NSKK, who was also president of Germany's highest racing organisation, Oberste Nationale Sportbehörde für die Deutsche Kraftfahrt. Hühnlein's declaration was published as a statement in the Völkischer Beobachter, the official Nazi Party newsletter. Hühnlein suggested that Lang had finished the season on 23 points, but this conflicts with the official scoring system, under which Hermann Paul Müller would have been the champion.

Summary of results

Scoring system
Unlike the modern Formula One points system, the championship awarded fewer points for higher finishes; the champion would be the driver who ended the season on the lowest points score. The championship awarded one, two and three points to first, second and third places respectively. Other competitors were awarded points based on the percentage of the race distance they completed, as follows.

Not entering, or failing to start the race, earned the driver eight points. Drivers only scored points with the car they entered the race with. In 1931, co-drivers were eligible to score championship points, but only from the car they were assigned to at the start, and provided that they had completed a stint in the car during the race. From 1932 onwards, if a driver handed his car over to another driver mid-race, only the original driver would score points from the car's final position.

Championship history

Footnotes

Further reading
 Chris Nixon, Racing the Silver Arrows: Mercedes-Benz versus Auto Union 1934-1939 (Osprey, London, 1986)

See also
 Grand Prix motor racing
 List of AIACR European Championship winners

External links
 The Golden Era of Grand Prix Racing

Formula racing series
European auto racing series
Recurring sporting events established in 1931
Recurring sporting events disestablished in 1939